Ighișu may refer to one of two places in Sibiu County, Romania:

 Ighișu Nou, a village in Mediaș city
 Ighișu Vechi, a village in Bârghiș Commune